Lau Ka Ming (born 31 December 1993 in Hong Kong) is a former Hong Kong professional footballer who played as a defender or a midfielder.

Family
Lau Ka Ming's brother Lau Hok Ming is also a professional football player.

Honours

Club
Yuen Long
 Hong Kong Senior Shield: 2017–18

International
Hong Kong
 Guangdong-Hong Kong Cup: 2018

References

External links
 
 HKFA

1993 births
Living people
Hong Kong footballers
Hong Kong Premier League players
Yuen Long FC players
Southern District FC players
Association football defenders
Association football midfielders